Batchawana Bay is a small bay in Algoma District in Northeastern Ontario, Canada. Marie.

The name "Batchawana" is derived from the Ojibwe word obatchiwanang (or spelled badjiwanung), meaning "current at the strait" or "narrows and swift water there", and refers to the turbulent or bubbling waters flowing between Batchawana Island and Sand Point where the lake narrows and a strong current and undertow results. The Ojibwe believed this was caused by an underwater spirit about to surface.

Geography
The bay, part of Whitefish Bay, is formed on the north side by the Whitefish Point on the Canadian side of Lake Superior. Havilland and Harmony Bays are 2 smaller sub-bays within it.

This pristine undeveloped island was also reputedly the site of Spirit houses (elevated graves) of the Ojibwe. Batchawana Island and Whitefish Point are both important routes and stopovers for migratory birds.

Batchawana Bay Provincial Park is located on the northern shore of the bay, and the unincorporated place and Compact Rural Community of Batchawana Bay is on the northwest shore of the bay. The community is along Highway 563.

History
Batchawana Bay was an important fishing site for the Ojibwe. A trading post was established near the mouth of the Batchawana River for fur trading around 1817 or 1819 by clerks of the North West Company. The Hudson's Bay Company appears to have operated a post there as well circa 1868-1869.

In the early 1920s, the largest fish ever recorded in the Great Lakes was caught by Frank Lapoint in the bay.  A sturgeon, it was reportedly 90 years old, measured 2.25 m (7.5 ft) and weighed 140 kg (310 lb).

The bay was historically notable as the dividing point separating the two Robinson Treaty areas between the Crown and the Ojibwe people.

See also
Goulais Bay - adjacent bay to the south

References

External links

Bays of Ontario
Landforms of Algoma District
Bays of Lake Superior